Faculty of Biology of the Belarusian State University was founded in 1931. It is a major biology research and teaching establishment in the country, which includes nine Departments and nine Research Laboratories. The Dean is Vadim V. Demidchyk, Docent, Doctor of Sciences

General information 
More than eleven thousands biologists have been graduated from the Faculty since 1931. About eighty graduates have received the ‘Doctor of Sciences’ degree (highest scientific degree, equivalent to Habilitation or old style UK D.Sc.); seven hundreds graduates obtained the ‘Candidate of Sciences’ degree (equivalent to Ph.D.).

A number of world-class researchers and outstanding managers of high education started their career in the Faculty. For example, Professor Leonid M. Sushchenya was graduated from the Faculty in 1953. He is widely accepted as one of the creators of modern Freshwater Biology. Leonid M. Sushchenya was an Academician of both Soviet and Belarusian Academies of Sciences. In 1990s, he was a President of National Academy of Sciences of Belarus (NASB). Another ecologist, Professor Alexander P. Ostapenya, was a Head of Hydrobiology Laboratory (largest in Europe). Professor Ekaterina I. Slobozhanina (graduated in 1967) is currently a Deputy Director of the Institute of Biophysics and Cell Engineering of the NASB. Another alumni, Professor Oleg G. Davydenko (graduated in 1973), works as a Head of Laboratory in the Institute of Genetics and Cytology of NASB. Vitaliy P. Semenchenko (graduated in 1973) is a Deputy Director General of NASB Scientific and Practical Center of Bio-resources. Professor Sergey A. Usanov (graduated in 1973) is a Head of the Institute of Bio-organic Chemistry of the NASB.

The highest standard in biology teaching is maintained due to the strong linkage between educational process and the scientific research in the Faculty. Internationally recognised centers for study of hydrobiology, biochemistry, plant ion transport, microbial molecular genetics, entomology and others have been established in the Faculty since 1931. The Faculty collaborates with NASB Department of Biological Sciences forming Joint University Centre between BSU and NASB. As a result, a number of research students have good quality publications and win Student Biology Olympiads, prizes and young scientist research grants both in Belarus and abroad.

The international collaboration is another strong feature of the Faculty. The Faculty routinely organises several key international conferences, such as «Lake Ecosystems: Biological Processes, Anthropogenic Transformation, Quality of Water», «Xenobiotics and Living Systems», etc., usually involving several hundred participants. The Faculty publishes peer-reviewed «Physiological, biochemical and molecular fundamentals of biological systems».

Apart of the NASB Department of Biological Sciences, the Faculty has established collaborative links with research institutions of NASB Department of Medical Sciences and NASB Department of Agricultural Sciences. The Faculty owes one of the Europe's most advanced Zoology Museum, which has recently been renovated to the highest international standard. It is also a home of old Fundamental Herbarium, University Botanical Gardens and Biological Theatre. The Faculty also owes a research base on Naroch Lake (large lake in the Northern Belarus), which is called «Vinberg’s Naroch Biological Station» and used both for teaching and research purposes.

Education 
•	High Education Diploma
is five years of studies for full-time students, and six years for distance learning students; totally about 5000 hours of auditorium and laboratory work. It is widely accepted as equivalent to Bachelor-level degree in the Western Europe. Note that the number of lecture and practical classes is significantly higher (sometimes by 10–15 times) in BSU's High Education Diploma than in most universities of Western Europe, North America or Australia (B.Sc. Course).

•	Magistrature
is usually one year-long postgraduate course, which is equivalent to Masters Course in English speaking countries. BSU also offers two-year Research Magistrature, which is equivalent to M.Diss. or M.Res. in English speaking countries.

•	Aspiranture
includes three and four-year programmes for the full-time and distant learning postgraduate students respectively. This is Candidate of Sciences course, which is equivalent to Ph.D. course in English speaking countries. It is internationally accredited and accepted.

•	Doctoranture
is 2–3 years of postgraduate research at the highest level (post-C.Sc./Ph.D.). It is an equivalent to Habilitation Course in Germany. Doctoranture is aimed at preparing Doctor of Sciences Dissertation, which does not exist anymore in English speaking countries, while it is still required in most European countries.

Specialities 
I. Biologу
Directions:
-	Research and Industry
-	Research and Teaching
-	Biotechnology

Qualifications:
-	Biologist
-	Biologist. Teacher of Biology and Chemistry
-	Biologist-Biotechnologist. Teacher of Biology

Specialisations:
-	Botany
-	Genetics
-	Human and Animal Physiology
-	Physiology of Plants
-	Molecular Biology
-	Zoology

II. Biochemistry
Qualification:
-	Biologist. Biochemist
Specialisations:
-	Medical Biochemistry
-	Analytical Biochemistry

III. Microbiology
Qualification:
-	Biologist. Microbiologist
Specialisations:
-	Applied Microbiology
-	Molecular Microbiology

IV. Bioecology
Qualification:
-	Biologist-Ecologist. Teacher of Biology and Ecology
Specialisation:
-	General Ecology

Faculty structure 
Departments
-	Biochemistry
-	Botany
-	Genetics
-	General Ecology and Biology Teaching
-	Human and Animal Physiology
-	Microbiology
-	Molecular Biology
-	Plant Physiology and Biochemistry
-	Zoology

Research laboratories
-	Hydroecology
-	Biotechnology
-	Molecular Genetics and Biotechnology
-	Physiology
-	Plant Cell Physiology and Biotechnology
-	Biochemistry of Metabolism
-	Applied Biochemistry
-	Biochemistry and Pharmacology of Bioactive Substances
-	Transgenic Plants

Student research laboratories
-	Molecular Biotechnology
-	Applied Plant Cell Biology and Biotechnology
-	Structure and Dynamics of Biodiversity

Museum of zoology
Museum of Zoology was established in 1921 at the initiative of the Head of Department of Zoology, Professor Anatoliy V. Fedyushin.
This Museum has the largest collection of zoological objects in the Republic (stuffed animals, birds nests, drugs, osteological material and other vertebrates as well as invertebrates), totally over 102 thousand units. Scientific collections of the museum are kept in special rooms occupying a total area of 980 m2. 260 species of the collection are listed in Red Data Book of the CIS countries and the world.

Over the last decade, the exhibition fund has been reinforced by such rare species as the red wolf, wandering albatross, ostrich, Hyacinth Macaw, a chimpanzee, some tropical insects and many other items that cannot be found in any other natural history museums in Belarus. In addition, the museum has a significant number of long-extinct fossil animals, for example, fragments of fossil elephant, discovered in 2006 during the construction of the Minsk Metro.

For a long time, the museum existed as a temporary exposition and only in 2001 the collection was moved to permanent premises with expanded storage facilities. Since then construction of landscapes and ecological dioramas displaying rare and endangered species in natural surroundings has been initiated.

Botanical garden
The Botanical Garden was founded in 1930 by Professor Stepan P. Melnik within the Department of Plant Systematics. Since 1933, it has been supervised by Natalia O. Tsetterman. In 1956, the Botanical Gardens covered 2 hectares of campus land and its collection included 37 species of trees, 19 species of shrubs and many herbaceous plants. In 1965, the Botanical Gardens moved to Schemyslitsa Training and Experimental Farm of the BSU. Since 2002, the Botanical Garden has been relocated to the fields near the Faculty of Biology at 10 Kurchatov Street. At present, it includes a greenhouse, arboretum and a piece of real ancient oak forest «Dubrava».

The collection of medical, decorative, perennial, rare and endangered plants contains over 900 species, varieties and forms. The collection of tropical and subtropical plants includes about 400 species and varieties belonging to 190 genera of 69 families. A number of species of tropical and subtropical plants can be found in the greenhouse, the conservatory and on the floors of the Faculty of Biology. Arboretum was founded in 1928 and, nowadays it embraces 250 species and forms of 96 genera and 38 families.

Georgiy vinberg naroch biological station
The scientific and research centre Georgiy Vinberg Naroch Biological Station is the oldest biological station in Belarus. For many years it has been a place where profound research on the functioning processes and biological productivity of the water bodies has been conducted. Results of these investigations are recognised by researchers in hydrobiology all over the world. The materials of long-term investigations of the polytypic Naroch Lakes serve as a basis for development of measures on rational use and preservation of the unique Naroch Lakes’ environment.

The primary objectives of Georgiy Vinberg Naroch Biological Station are:
- educational : to serve as a basis for professional training of ecologists and hydrobiologists;
- scientific : to carry out fundamental and applied research in the field of biology and ecology;
- environmental protection : to provide scientific assistance for nature conservation of the National Park Narochansky;
- informative : to popularise ecological knowledge.

Main fields of research 
 	Diversity and ecology of higher plants, fungi, lichens and the ways of maintaining the biodiversity of flora. Characterisation of new plant species.
 	Genetic basis, mechanisms of biosynthesis and secretion of hydrolytic enzymes, factors of pathogenicity and virulence of phytopathogenic bacteria.
 	Biological variety of Belarusian fauna, studies of individual animal species at the biocenosis level.
 	Molecular and cellular mechanisms of plant ion transport, mineral exchange, radionuclide uptake from the soil, signaling and early events in stress response leading to plant stress resistance or programmed cell death.
	The physiology and biotechnology of plant cell, tissue and organ cultures.
 	Neuronal and biochemical mechanisms of homeostasis and its maintenance under different physical and chemical conditions.
 	Matter turnover and energy flow in water ecosystems, lake, river and reservoir productivity, self-purification; formation of water quality.
 	Molecular mechanisms of xenobiotics action on environment.
	Pharmacological compounds, compositions and extracts of plant and animal origin, exhibiting anticancer, radioprotective, photoprotective and antimutagenic activities.
 	Molecular genetic mechanisms of microbial synthesis of compounds for applications in biotechnology.

Biology organizations